Hiroden-Nishi-Hiroshima Station is a Hiroden terminal station on Hiroden Main Line and Hiroden Miyajima Line, located south side of the JR Nishi-Hiroshima Station in Koi-hon-machi, Nishi-ku, Hiroshima.

Routes
From Nishi-hiroshima Station, there are two of Hiroden Streetcar routes.
 Hiroshima Station - Hiroden-miyajima-guchi Route
Most trains goes straight through from each side.
 Hiroden-nishi-hiroshima - Hiroshima Port Route

Platforms
No.1 for Hiroden-miyajima-guchi (#2, Miyajiam Line)
No.2 for Hiroshima Station (#2, Main Line)
No.3 for Hiroden-miyajima-guchi (#2, Miyajiam Line)
No.4 for Hiroshima Port (departure) (#3, Main Line)
No.5 from Hiroshima Port (arrival)
No.6 for Hiroden-honsha-mae or Hiroshima Port (for rush hours)
No.7 (not used)

Connections
█ Main Line / █ Miyajima Line

Fukushima-cho — Hiroden-nishi-hiroshima Station — Higashi-takasu
█ Main Line

Hiroden-nishi-hiroshima Station — Fukushima-cho

Other services connections

JR lines
JR lines connections at Nishi-Hiroshima Station

Bus services routes
Bus services routes connections at Nishi-Hiroshima Station

History
Opened as "Koi" tram stop of Main Line for municipal connection on December 8, 1912.
Opened as "Koi-machi" station of Miyajima Line for suburban connection on August 22, 1922.
Renamed the station on Miyajima Line from "Koi-machi" to "Nishi-Hiroshima" on August 22, 1931.
Started the through train operation to connect Main Line and Miyajima Line directly in 1962.
Renamed the station on Miyajima Line from "Nishi-Hiroshima" to "Hiroden-Nishi-Hiroshima" on October 1, 1969.
Started the through train operation for every trains in 1991.
Rebuilt both "Koi" and "Hiroden-Nishi-Hiroshima" stations together as one station "Hiroden-nishi-hiroshima (Koi)" station on November 1, 2001.

References

See also
Hiroden Streetcar Lines and Routes

Hiroden Main Line stations
Hiroden Miyajima Line stations
Railway stations in Japan opened in 1912